Abdullah Matuq (born 2 April 2003) is a Saudi Arabian professional footballer who plays as a winger for Pro League side Al-Shabab.

Career 
Matuq started at Al-Shabab's youth team and was promoted to the first team during the 2021–22 season. On 12 August 2021, Matuq made his professional debut for Al-Shabab against Abha in the Pro League, replacing Nawaf Al-Abed.

Career statistics

Club

Honours

International
Saudi Arabia U20
 Arab Cup U-20: 2021

References

External links 
 

2003 births
Living people
Saudi Arabian footballers
Saudi Arabia youth international footballers
Association football forwards
Saudi Professional League players
Al-Ansar FC (Medina) players
Al-Shabab FC (Riyadh) players